NGC 902 is a barred spiral galaxy in the constellation Cetus. It is estimated to be 314 million light-years from the Milky Way and has a diameter of approximately 50,000 ly. NGC 902 was discovered on November 28, 1885 by Francis Leavenworth.

See also 
 List of NGC objects (1–1000)

References

External links 
 

Barred spiral galaxies
0902
Cetus (constellation)
009021